The following ships of the Indian Navy have been named Ganga:

Indian Navy ship names